The following lists events that happened during 1833 in New Zealand.

Incumbents

Regal and viceregal
Head of State – King William IV
Governor of New South Wales – Major-General Sir Richard Bourke

Government and law
British Resident in New Zealand – James Busby

Events 
10 May – James Busby arrives in the Bay of Islands on HMS Imogene.
16 May – James Busby meets 22 leading chiefs at Paihia and reads them a message from King William IV.
October/November
 – Alfred Nesbitt Brown along with Henry Williams, John Morgan and William Fairburn visit the Thames Valley and reach Matamata.(see also 1834 & 1835)
November/December
 – A mission is established at Puriri.

Undated
The building of the house for James Busby is begun. After the signing of the Treaty of Waitangi there in 1840 it will be known as the Treaty House.
The keystone above the door of the Stone Store in Kerikeri is carved.
Late in the year Louisa, daughter of John and Elizabeth Guard, is born at Port Underwood. She is the first female European child born in the South Island.

Births
 1 January (in Scotland): Robert Lawson, architect.
 27 January (in Australia): William Larnach, businessman, politician.
 31 May (in Scotland): David Boyle, 7th Earl of Glasgow, 14th Governor of New Zealand.
 14 September (in Scotland): John Bryce, politician.
 23 September (in England): William Hodgkins, artist and art historian.
 20 October (in England): Arthur Atkinson, politician.
 undated (in Hokitika): Richard Hobbs, politician.

See also
List of years in New Zealand
Timeline of New Zealand history
History of New Zealand
Military history of New Zealand
Timeline of the New Zealand environment
Timeline of New Zealand's links with Antarctica

References